This is a list of protected areas in Bulgaria which includes 3 national parks, 11 nature parks and 55 nature reserves. The national policy for governing and management of the protected areas is implemented by the Ministry of Environment and Water. The first nature park in Bulgaria and the Balkan Peninsula is Vitosha Nature Park, established in 1934. All of the nationally protected areas in Bulgaria are also part of the Natura 2000 network of protected natural areas in the territory of the European Union. Bulgaria has some of the largest Natura 2000 areas in the European Union covering 33.8% of its territory.

 Parks and reserves in italic letters are part of Global 200 ecoregions.

National Parks

Nature Parks

Nature Reserves

See also
 Geography of Bulgaria
 List of ecoregions in Bulgaria

References

External links 
Register of protected areas and protected zones in Bulgaria
Parks in Bulgaria

Bulgaria

Protected areas
Bulgaria
Protected areas